The Chess Monthly was a short-lived monthly chess magazine produced from January 1857 and May 1861 in the United States. Edited by professional diplomat and linguistics professor Daniel Willard Fiske, it was co-edited for a time by Paul Morphy. The magazine was based in New York City.

Eugene B. Cook (1830–1915) and Sam Loyd edited the chess problems section.  Running for only five volumes, the magazine is perhaps best remembered today for a series of articles written by Silas Mitchell regarding The Turk, the chess-playing machine that perished in a fire in Philadelphia prior to the publication of the magazine.

References

 
 Tom Standage, The Turk: The Life and Times of the Famous Eighteenth-Century Chess-Playing Machine. Walker and Company, New York City, 2002. 
 Gerald M. Levitt, The Turk, Chess Automaton. McFarland and Company Inc. Publishers, Jefferson, North Carolina, 2000.
 Moravian Chess Publishing House Volume Listing.
 Chess Monthly, Volume 3, 1859
 Chess Monthly, Volume 4, 1860
 The Chess Monthly archive at HathiTrust

Chess periodicals
Chess in the United States
1857 in chess
Magazines established in 1857
Magazines disestablished in 1861
Defunct magazines published in the United States
Monthly magazines published in the United States
Magazines published in New York City
1857 establishments in New York (state)